Rao is a Chinese family name. It can also be spelled as "Yow" or "Yaw".

The surname Rao is approximately 2200 years old, and originated in the area near present-day Linfen county in Shanxi province.

It is the 181st most common name being shared by around 730,000 people or 0.055% of the population with the province with the most people being Jiangxi. It is on the Hundred Family Surnames poem.

Notable people
 Jao Tsung-I (1917–2018), Hong Kong Chinese calligrapher
 Ngeow Sze Chan (1915–2002), Malaysian practitioner of traditional Chinese medicine
 Rao Ching-ling (born 1969), magistrate of Taitung County
 Rao Shushi (1903–1975), senior member of the Chinese Communist Party
 Rao Yi (born 1962 in Jiangxi), neuroscientist
 Rao Yutai (1891–1968), physicist
 Yaw Shin Leong (born 1976), Singaporean politician
 Nyu Kok Meng, Malaysian and convicted robber who committed armed robbery in Singapore.
Individual Chinese surnames

References

Chinese-language surnames